Khanpur is a village in the Mukerian tehsil of Hoshiarpur district in the northern Indian state of Punjab. The village is administrated by a sarpanch who is an elected representative of the village as per Panchayati raj system.

References 

Villages in Hoshiarpur district